Toxopterina is a genus of true bugs belonging to the family Aphididae.

The species of this genus are found in Europe.

Species:
 Toxopterina vandergooti (Börner, 1933)

References

Aphididae